Wayne MacArthur Wilson (born September 4, 1957) is a former professional American football running back who played in the National Football League (NFL) for nine seasons for the New Orleans Saints, Minnesota Vikings, and Washington Redskins. Wilson played for Howard High School. He played college football at Shepherd College and was drafted in the 12th round of the 1979 NFL Draft by the Houston Oilers. His best season was as a starting fullback for New Orleans in 1983, when he led the team with 11 touchdowns, gaining 787 yards rushing, 178 yards receiving, and 239 yards returning kickoffs.

References

1957 births
Living people
American football running backs
Minnesota Vikings players
New Orleans Saints players
People from Montgomery County, Maryland
Washington Redskins players
Shepherd Rams football players
National Football League replacement players